Justin Bonsignore (born February 3, 1988) is an American racing driver who competes in NASCAR's Whelen Modified Tour and various other local racing circuits.  He currently drives for Kenneth Massa Motorsports.

Early career and go-karts 
Bonsignore began his racing career with go-karts at the age of 8. His family has long owned and operated a Kart Racing Shop, and this early exposure to the racing circuit paved the way for a career in racing.

In 1997, Bonsignore competed for his first national event at the Rockingham Speedway, in North Carolina, where he finished 13th. During his go-kart career Bonsignore has secured 18 national event wins, 13 poles, and 45 top-5 finishes in 81 national starts. Highlights include wins at Len Sammon's Indoor Kart Race at the Dunkin' Donuts Center in Providence, Rhode Island and the East End Shootout at Riverhead Raceway.

Chargers and modified

In 2005, Bonsignore began racing stock cars. Competing in Riverhead Raceway's Charger Division, and NASCAR Dodge Weekly Racing Series, Bonsignore finished third in the series standings, was awarded Rookie of the Year, and secured the best rookie finish on record.

In 2006, Bonsignore joined the NASCAR Modified Division, where he scored three top-5 and nine top-10 finishes. For the second year in a row, Bonsignore received honors from NASCAR, taking home the Rookie of the Year title for the Modified Division and claiming a seventh-place finish overall, a new best for a rookie driver.

Hopes for a higher finish in 2007 were cut short due to a wrist injury.

2008 saw Bonsignore's first stock car win in 2008 and the division's most top-5 and top-10 finishes en route to an 8th-place points finish.

2009 proved a very successful season performance wise, but bad luck kept overall results below expectations. During the season, Bonsignore broke a long winless streak and won the Cromarty Cup 50 Lap race, qualifying on the pole and leading every lap.

In the NASCAR Whelen Modified Tour race Bonsignore was able to match a career-best 4th-place finish.

M3 Technology Racing
2009 also marked the first collaboration between Bonsignore and local business owner Ken Massa. During the summer, the two discussed and formed a team with the intention of competing full-time on the NASCAR Whelen Modified Tour. In the team's first race together, they scored a 2nd-place finish at the Sundance Vacations Speedway in St. John's, PA (the former and later Mountain Speedway; to be called Evergreen Raceway Park starting in 2014) in the King of the Mountain 150.

The 2010 season showed the promise of the new team, as Bonsignore was named the 2010 Sunoco Rookie of the Year. Finishing a strong 13th in the standings, a series of mechanical accidents and bad luck ruined a potential top-10 run. Bonsignore became the first NASCAR Whelen Modified Tour driver to earn a Coors Light Pole Award at Bristol Motor Speedway and Stafford Motor Speedway. 2010 saw the M3 Racing team take home two top 5 finishes, and four top 10 finishes.

M3 Technology and Bonsignore returned to the Tour for the 2011 season, and once again competed throughout the year at Riverhead Raceway. On July 30, 2011, Bonsignore won his first Whelen Modified Tour race at his local track, Riverhead Raceway. He started on the outside pole and led the final 158 laps in dominating fashion. Bonsignore also won the NASCAR Weekly Series Modified championship at Riverhead Raceway, clinching that on September 10, 2011.

In 2012 and 2013 Bonsignore finished 7th and 8th in the points respectively, picking up two more wins at Thompson Speedway Motorsports Park and Monadnock Speedway.

2014 saw a change for Bonsignore and the M3 Technology team as they would switch from Troyer to Spafco Chassis and Robert Yates Racing Spec engines. Performance improved as Bonsignore won 3 races on the way to a 3rd-place finish in points. Winning speed returned in 2015, with two more race wins, however, the team lacked consistency on the way to a 10th-place finish in points.

The 2016 season proved to be a career year at the time for Bonsignore, scoring 4 wins and 13 top 5s on the way to a runner-up points finish to Doug Coby. 2017 was not as kind, with Bonsignore going winless for the first time since 2010, only leading 4 laps all season.

2018 was another year of change for the No. 51 team. The team switched chassis manufacturers again to the potent FURY Chassis, bringing in Ryan Stone as crew chief. These changes paid off as Bonsignore won the 2018 NASCAR Whelen Modified Tour championship on the strength of 8 wins, 5 poles, 12 Top 5's, 15 top 10's, and 695 laps lead, leading every category.

Motorsports career results

NASCAR
(key) (Bold – Pole position awarded by qualifying time. Italics – Pole position earned by points standings or practice time. * – Most laps led.)

Whelen Modified Tour

 Season still in progress
 Ineligible for series points

External links 
 
 Justin Bonsignore
 M3 Technology Racing
 M3 Technology
 NASCAR Whelen Modified Tour

References 

Living people
NASCAR drivers
NASCAR people
People from Long Island
Racing drivers from New York (state)
1988 births